S1C may refer to:

 S-1C, a variant of the Pitts Special, biplane
 S-IC, the first stage of the Saturn V rocket
 S1C reactor, United States Navy submarine nuclear reactor